Our Fair Lady is an LP album by Julie London, released by Liberty Records under catalog number LRP-3392 as a monophonic recording and catalog number LST-7392 in stereo in 1965.

Most of the material had been previously released. Tracks 3-5 & 8 were the only new songs, recorded October 9–10, 1964, in sessions arranged by Richard Wess. According to London biographer Michael Owen, an additional song, "House Where Love Is," was recorded at the October 9–10 sessions and "presumably remains in the vaults."

Track listing

 "The Days of Wine and Roses" (Henry Mancini, Johnny Mercer)–2:49
 "Call Me Irresponsible" (Jimmy Van Heusen, Sammy Cahn)–2:46
 "Theme from  Summer Place" (Max Steiner, Mack Discant)–2:16
 "As Time Goes By" (Herman Hupfeld)–3:07 
 "More (Theme from Mondo Cane)" (Riz Ortolani, Nino Oliviero, Norman Newell)–2:35
 "Charade" (Henry Mancini, Johnny Mercer)–2:25
 "Never On Sunday" (Manos Hadjidakis, Billy Towne)–2:20
 "An Affair to Remember" (Harry Warren, Leo McCarey , Harold Adamson)–2:50
 "Wives and Lovers" (Burt Bacharach, Hal David)–2:39
 "Fascination" (Fermo Dante Marchetti, Maurice de Féraudy, Dick Manning)–1:57
 "Boy on a Dolphin" (Takis Morakis, Jean Fermanoglou, Paul Francis Webster)–2:06 
 "The Second Time Around" (Jimmy Van Heusen, Sammy Cahn)–3:00

 Tracks 1, 2 from  The End of the World
 Tracks 6, 9 from Julie London
 Tracks 7, 10, 12 from Love Letters
 Track 11 from 1957 single

Selected personnel (Oct 1964 session)
 Julie London - vocals
 Gene Cipriano - oboe
 Paul Horn - flute
 Ernie Freeman - piano
 Tommy Allsup - guitar
 John Gray - guitar
 Red Callender - double bass
 Earl Palmer - drums
 Julius Wechter - percussion
 Richard Wess - arranger
 David Hassinger - engineer

Notes

References

Owen, Michael (2017). Go Slow: The Life of Julie London. Chicago Review Press.

Liberty Records albums
1965 albums
Julie London albums
Albums arranged by Ernie Freeman
Albums produced by Snuff Garrett